Yovcho Zhivkov Yovchev (born 27 March 1991) is a Bulgarian cyclist who last rode for .

He was suspended for doping from 14 September 2012 until 31 December 2015.

Major results
2010
 1st Stage 1 Tour of Romania
 3rd National Time Trial Championships
2011
 1st Prologue Tour of Romania

References

1991 births
Living people
Bulgarian male cyclists
Doping cases in cycling